"Feelin' You" is the debut single released by American R&B singer-songwriter Solange from her debut album Solo Star.

Track listing
US CD single
 "Feelin' You (Part I w/o Rap)" - 3:22
 "Feelin' You (Part I)" - 4:00
 "Feelin' You (Nu Soul Dance Mix)" - 7:12
 "Feelin' You (Club Mix)" - 9:34
 "Feelin' You (Part II w/o Rap H-Town Screwed Mix)" - 5:07

Europe CD single
 "Feelin' You (Part II)" - 4:06
 "Feelin' You (Nu Soul Dance Mix)" - 7:12
 "Feelin' You (Club Mix)" - 9:34
 "Feelin' You (Part I)" - 4:00
 "Feelin' You (Part II - Music Video)" - 3:58

Charts

Release history

References

2002 debut singles
2002 songs
Solange Knowles songs
Music videos directed by Sanaa Hamri
Song recordings produced by Solange Knowles
Songs written by Solange Knowles
Songs written by N.O.R.E.